Press Start -Symphony of Games- is a series of Japanese video game music concerts introduced in 2006. It was initiated by several industry professionals and is sponsored by the Japanese publishing company Enterbrain.

Development
Inspired by the big success of earlier events, such as the Orchestral Game Music Concerts and the Symphonic Game Music Concerts, several industry professionals collaborated to create a new Japanese game concert series. In 2006, conductor Taizo Takemoto, game designer Masahiro Sakurai, scenario writer Kazushige Nojima and composers Nobuo Uematsu and Shogo Sakai formed an executive committee to develop Press Start. Hoping to distinguish the performances from foreign concerts and making it better than the other series, Uematsu preferred to select only music from Japanese games, though Press Start was always designed not to be limited to just one game series or console.

Press Start 2006 -Symphony of Games-
Date: September 22
Venue: Bunkamura Orchard Hall
Conductor: Taizo Takemoto
Orchestra: Tokyo City Philharmonic Orchestra

Press Start 2006 marked the first Japanese orchestral performance of music from various game series after the ten-year hiatus following the Orchestral Game Music Concert 5. The event took place one day before the Tokyo Game Show opened for the public and was presented by Rie Tanaka, with Sakurai and Uematsu joining her as commentators. Additionally, every track featured guest appearances of the respective composers telling an anecdote from the time they composed that specific soundtrack. The executive committee expressed its satisfaction with the concert afterwards and announced there were plans for another event at a bigger concert hall in 2007.

Press Start 2007 -Symphony of Games-
Date and venue (Yokohama): September 17, Pacifico Yokohama
Date and venue (Osaka): September 22, Umeda Arts Theater
Conductor: Taizo Takemoto
Orchestra: Press Start Gadget Orchestra and Press Start 2007 Chorus

Due to positive reactions and support from fans, the series was expanded to offer two performances in Yokohama and Osaka, allowing more people to attend the event in 2007. Both concerts featured exclusive tracks that were not performed at the other venue and were accompanied by game footage on a big screen. Press Start 2007 was presented by Chisa Yokoyama.

Press Start 2008 -Symphony of Games-
Date and venue (Tokyo): September 14, Bunkamura Orchard Hall
Date and venue (Shanghai): October 31, Shanghai International Gymnastic Center
Conductor: Taizo Takemoto
Orchestra: Kanagawa Philharmonic Orchestra

In 2008, the series expanded again to hold one concert in Tokyo and one in Shanghai, China. Both performances were presented by Keiko Washino. The event in China dropped some of the new arrangements and replaced them with tracks from earlier Press Start concerts.

Press Start 2009 -Symphony of Games-
Date: August 2
Venue: Tokyo Metropolitan Art Space

Two concerts were held at the same venue in the Ikebukuro district of Tokyo, with one performance beginning in the early afternoon and the other one in the evening.

References

External links
Press Start -Symphony of Games-
Enterbrain
Famitsu
Tokyo City Philharmonic Orchestra
Kanagawa Philharmonic Orchestra
Bunkamura
Pacifico Yokohama
Umeda Arts Theater
Shanghai International Gymnastic Center
Tokyo Metropolitan Art Space

Video game concert tours
2006 concert tours
2007 concert tours
2008 concert tours
2009 concert tours